The Applied Economics Research Centre (AERC) is a research institute of University of Karachi. It was established in 1973 by the Government of Sindh and financially assisted by Ford Foundation. Prof. Dr. Ehsan Rasheed, the distinguished alumni of Aligarh University and the son of noted scholar Rashid Ahmad Siddiqui, was the first founding Director of the AERC. Prof. Dr. Samina Khalil is the present director of the institute

Initially there was only two-year post-master course of M.A.S. at AERC, but now it offers M.A.S, M.Phil., and Ph.D. courses. It has the largest economics research library in Pakistan and hold entire past publications of International Monetary Fund, World Bank, Asian Development Bank and State Bank of Pakistan.

See also

List of universities in Karachi
List of universities in Pakistan
Economics
History of economics
List of economics topics

External links
 AERC Official Website

Economic research institutes
Research institutes in Pakistan
University of Karachi
Science and technology in Pakistan
1973 establishments in Pakistan